The 2004 Quebec municipal referendums were held by the Quebec Liberal Party government of Jean Charest that came to power in the 2003 Quebec election, in fulfillment of a campaign promise to allow voters to have a say regarding the municipal reorganization program that had been undertaken by the preceding Parti Québécois administration.

From late 2000 to 2003, the PQ government had amalgamated (merged) many Quebec cities with their suburbs or neighbouring municipalities.  This was imposed through legislation by the Quebec government rather than by the initiative of the municipalities themselves. In Canada, municipal governments are creatures of the provincial governments. However, the amalgamation proved unpopular in some places, with residents wishing to de-merge from the newly expanded cities and reconstitute their former municipalities.  The 2004 referendums were organized to provide an opportunity to vote on the matter.

Signing of registers
As a first step, a minimum threshold of 10% of the population of a former municipality was required to sign a register in order for a referendum to be held.  The registers were open from 16 to 20 May 2004.  The results are shown below (those in bold were successful):
 Adstock
 Municipality of Adstock (0.45%)
 Village of Sainte-Anne-du-Lac (3.86%)
 Alma
 City of Alma (Nobody)
 Municipality of Delisle (0.12%)
 Beauharnois
 City of Beauharnois (0.20%)
 City of Maple Grove (23.94%)
 Village of Melocheville (10.50%)
 Cookshire-Eaton
 City of Cookshire (5.81%)
 Municipality of Eaton (2.57%)
 Township of Newport, Quebec (21.58%)
 Gatineau
 City of Aylmer (17.22%)
 City of Buckingham (13.87%)
 City of Gatineau (5.40%)
 City of Hull (10.09%)
 City of Masson-Angers (20.14%)
 Grenville-sur-la-Rouge
 Village of Calumet (6.98%)
 Township of Grenville (1.57%)
 Les Îles-de-la-Madeleine
 Village of Cap-aux-Meules (16.64%)
 Municipality of Fatima (4.11%)
 Municipality of Grande-Entrée (0.74%)
 Municipality of Grosse-Île (35.02%)
 Municipality of Havre-aux-Maisons (1.23%)
 Municipality of L'Étang-du-Nord (0.61%)
 Municipality of L'Île-du-Havre-Aubert (3.28%)
 La Tuque
 Municipality of La Bostonnais (21.11%)
 Municipality of La Croche (10.42%)
 Municipality of La Tuque (0.15%)
 Municipality of Lac-Édouard (17.16%)
 Village of Parent (14.39%)
 Lac-Etchemin
 City of Lac-Etchemin (Nobody)
 Parish of Sainte-Germaine-du-Lac-Etchemin (1.26%)
 Lacolle
 Village of Lacolle (0.42%)
 Parish of Notre-Dame-du-Mont-Carmel (14.50%)
 Lévis
 City of Charny (10.71%)
 City of Lévis (3.71%)
 Municipality of Pintendre (4.48%)
 Parish of Sainte-Hélène-de-Breakeyville (7.28%)
 Municipality of Saint-Étienne-de-Lauzon (23.38%)
 City of Saint-Jean-Chrysostome (7.45%)
 Parish of Saint-Joseph-de-la-Pointe-de-Lévy (4.14%)
 City of Saint-Nicolas (16.64%)
 City of Saint-Rédempteur (14.52%)
 City of Saint-Romuald (8.13%)
 Longueuil
 City of Boucherville (34.73%)
 City of Brossard (23.48%)
 City of Greenfield Park (16.71%)
 City of LeMoyne (2.23%)
 City of Longueuil (0.43%)
 City of Saint-Bruno-de-Montarville (36.20%)
 City of Saint-Hubert (1.84%)
 City of Saint-Lambert (31.16%)
 Magog
 City of Magog, Quebec (0.31%)
 Township of Magog (17.99%)
 Village of Omerville (0.96%)
 Matane
 City of Matane (0.15%)
 Municipality of Petit-Matane (16.62%)
 Parish of Saint-Jérôme-de-Matane (5.13%)
 Municipality of Saint-Luc-de-Matane (13.49%)
 Métis-sur-Mer
 Les Boules (4.46%)
 Métis-sur-Mer (11.40%)
 Mont-Joli
 City of Mont-Joli (0.04%)
 Municipality of Saint-Jean-Baptiste (12.79%)
 Mont-Laurier
 Municipality of Des Ruisseaux (2.14%)
 City of Mont-Laurier (0.03%)
 Municipality of Saint-Aimé-du-Lac-des-Îles (34.62%)
 Montreal
 City of Anjou (16.88%)
 City of Baie-d'Urfé (57.37%)
 City of Beaconsfield (37.72%)
 City (Cité) of Côte Saint-Luc (25.81%)
 City of Dollard-des-Ormeaux (24.11%)
 City (Cité) of Dorval (31.19%)
 City of Hampstead (24.71%)
 City of Kirkland (28.49%)
 City of Lachine (6.78%)
 City of LaSalle (11.21%)
 City of L'Île-Bizard (21.21%)
 City of L'Île-Dorval (79.17%)
 City of Montreal (0.18%)
 City of Montreal-Est (36.02%)
 City of Montreal-Nord (1.62%)
 City of Montreal West (36.71%)
 City of Mount Royal (24.36%)
 City of Outremont (2.60%)
 City of Pierrefonds (15.87%)
 City of Pointe-Claire (36.55%)
 City of Roxboro (25.08%)
 City of Sainte-Anne-de-Bellevue (26.83%)
 City of Sainte-Geneviève (14.21%)
 City of Saint-Laurent (18.53%)
 City of Saint-Léonard (3.23%)
 Village of Senneville (61.80%)
 City of Verdun (2.24%)
 City of Westmount (38.49%)
 Mont-Tremblant
 Municipality of Lac-Tremblant-Nord (42.77%)
 Municipality of Mont-Tremblant (21.38%)
 City of Saint-Jovite (0.26%)
 Parish of Saint-Jovite (0.58%)
 Port-Cartier
 City of Port-Cartier (0.13%)
 Municipality of Rivière-Pentecôte (1.35%)
 Quebec City
 City of Beauport (12.85%)
 City of Cap-Rouge (17.28%)
 City of Charlesbourg (13.44%)
 City of Lac-Saint-Charles (21.47%)
 City of L'Ancienne-Lorette (29.64%)
 City of Loretteville (11.19%)
 City of Quebec (2.65%)
 Municipality of Saint-Augustin-de-Desmaures (24.40%)
 City of Sainte-Foy (20.20%)
 City of Saint-Émile (15.01%)
 City of Sillery (24.35%)
 City of Val-Bélair (13.31%)
 City of Vanier (17.34%)
 Rimouski
 Municipality of Mont-Lebel (Nobody)
 City of Pointe-au-Père (1.09%)
 City of Rimouski (0.06%)
 Village of Rimouski-Est (0.47%)
 Parish of Sainte-Blandine (0.54%)
 Parish of Sainte-Odile-sur-Rimouski (2.50%)
 Rivière-Rouge
 Municipality of La Macaza (31.34%)
 Village of L'Annonciation (0.44%)
 Municipality of Marchand (0.32%)
 Village of Sainte-Véronique (15.38%)
 Rouyn-Noranda
 Municipality of Arntfield (1.66%)
 Municipality of Bellecombe (1.13%)
 City of Cadillac (7.04%)
 Municipality of Cléricy (1.28%)
 Municipality of Cloutier (5.63%)
 Municipality of D’Alembert (6.94%)
 Municipality of Destor (Nobody)
 Municipality of Évain (4.09%)
 Municipality of McWatters (4.46%)
 Municipality of Montbeillard (1.02%)
 Municipality of Mont-Brun (24.14%)
 Municipality of Rollet (4.50%)
 City of Rouyn-Noranda (0.06%)
 Saguenay
 City of Chicoutimi (5.53%)
 City of Jonquière (1.67%)
 City of La Baie (9.67%)
 Municipality of Lac-Kénogami (1.60%)
 City of Laterrière (6.66%)
 Municipality of Shipshaw (0.92%)
 Township of Tremblay (0.66%)
 Sainte-Agathe-des-Monts
 Municipality of Ivry-sur-le-Lac (24.79%)
 City of Sainte-Agathe-des-Monts (0.11%)
 Municipality of Sainte-Agathe-Nord (16.26%)
 Sainte-Marguerite-Estérel
 City of Estérel (35.44%)
 Parish of Sainte-Marguerite-du-Lac-Masson (0.10%)
 Saint-Georges
 Municipality of Aubert-Gaillon (15.78%)
 City of Saint-Georges (0.16%)
 Parish of Saint-Georges-Est (9.16%)
 Parish of Saint-Jean-de-la-Lande (3.83%)
 Saint-Hyacinthe
 Parish of Notre-Dame-de-Saint-Hyacinthe (2.93%)
 City of Sainte-Rosalie (1.06%)
 Parish of Sainte-Rosalie (13.51%)
 City of Saint-Hyacinthe (0.11%)
 Parish of Saint-Hyacinthe-le-Confesseur (6.37%)
 Parish of Saint-Thomas-d'Aquin (3.44%)
 Saint-Jean-sur-Richelieu
 City of Iberville (3.36%)
 Municipality of L'Acadie (5.14%)
 Parish of Saint-Athanase (13.46%)
 City of Saint-Jean-sur-Richelieu (0.37%)
 City of Saint-Luc (1.17%)
 Saint-Jérôme
 City of Bellefeuille (0.71%)
 City of Lafontaine (0.13%)
 City of Saint-Antoine (0.28%)
 City of Saint-Jérôme (0.05%)
 Saint-Pie
 City of Saint-Pie (0.16%)
 Parish of Saint-Pie (3.48%)
 Saint-Sauveur
 Parish of Saint-Sauveur (0.27%)
 Village of Saint-Sauveur-des-Monts (0.06%)
 Salaberry-de-Valleyfield
 Municipality of Grande-Île (18.60%)
 City of Saint-Timothée (19.51%)
 City of Salaberry-de-Valleyfield (0.20%)
 Sept-Îles
 Municipality of Gallix (11.79%)
 City of Moisie (3.12%)
 City of Sept-Îles (1.68%)
 Shawinigan
 City of Grand-Mère (17.93%)
 Municipality of Lac-à-la-Tortue (11.52%)
 Village of Saint-Georges (13.79%)
 Parish of Saint-Gérard-des-Laurentides (19.27%)
 Parish of Saint-Jean-des-Piles (12.03%)
 City of Shawinigan (0.29%)
 City of Shawinigan-Sud (7.94%)
 Sherbrooke
 Municipality of Ascot (1.13%)
 City of Bromptonville (12.76%)
 Municipality of Deauville (17.69%)
 City of Fleurimont (1.17%)
 City of Lennoxville (14.97%)
 City of Rock Forest (4.59%)
 Municipality of Saint-Élie-d'Orford (21.84%)
 City of Sherbrooke (0.21%)
 Municipality of Stoke (2.86%)
 Note: only a very small part of the population of Stoke had merged with Sherbrooke
 Sutton
 Township of Sutton (12.64%)
 City of Sutton (0.35%)
 Terrebonne
 City of La Plaine (0.61%)
 City of Lachenaie (0.77%)
 City of Terrebonne (0.09%)
 Thetford Mines
 City of Black Lake (17.41%)
 Municipality of Pontbriand (8.74%)
 Village of Robertsonville (18.39%)
 City of Thetford Mines (0.48%)
 Township of Thetford-Partie-Sud (0.97%)
 Trois-Rivières
 City of Cap-de-la-Madeleine (6.56%)
 Municipality of Pointe-du-Lac (4.35%)
 City of Sainte-Marthe-du-Cap (4.52%)
 City of Saint-Louis-de-France (4.55%)
 City of Trois-Rivières (0.30%)
 City of Trois-Rivières-Ouest (1.32%)
 Val-d'Or
 Municipality of Dubuisson (7.39%)
 Municipality of Sullivan (1.23%)
 City of Val-d'Or (0.04%)
 Municipality of Val-Senneville (3.46%)
 Municipality of Vassan (0.39%)

Referendums
On June 20, 2004, referendums were scheduled in the following municipalities. To be unmerged, they had to obtain a more than 50% of the vote for "yes", representing at least 35% of the electors. Municipalities that met those conditions are shown in bold. Municipalities obtaining only one of the two requirements are marked with an asterisk. *
 Anjou (57.03% and 26.47%)*
 Aubert-Gallion (34.63% and 22.63%)
 Aylmer (58.05% and 26.48%)*
 Baie-d'Urfé (92.94% and 72.80%)
 Beaconsfield (80.44% and 45.88%)
 Beauport (46.16% and 19.42%)
 Black Lake (37.86% and 26.24%)
 Boucherville (75.66% and 47.95%)
 Bromptonville (38.65% and 20.01%)
 Brossard (80.94% and 38.70%)
 Buckingham (41.77% and 20.27%)
 Cap-aux-Meules (62.77% and 39.81%)
 
 Cap-Rouge (39.00% and 22.48%)
 Charlesbourg (43.42% and 18.40%)
 Charny (47.77% and 18.29%)
 Côte-Saint-Luc (87.04% and 40.43%)
 Deauville (55.11% and 26.11%)*
 Dollard-des-Ormeaux (85.23% and 37.58%)
 Dorval (76.80% and 41.41%)
 Estérel (83.73% and 52.11%)
 Gallix (22.91% and 10.50%)
 Grande-Île (59.72% and 30.40%)*
 Grand-Mère (51.05% and 25.38%)*
 Greenfield Park (65.51% and 27.34%)*
 Grosse-Île (81.70% and 60.09%)
 Hampstead (90.41% and 47.21%)
 Hull (39.64% and 15.71%)
 Ivry-sur-le-Lac (67.98% and 40.47%)
 Kirkland (87.63% and 47.32%)
 La Bostonnais (74.31% and 40.91%)
 La Croche (35.71% and 11.01%)
 La Macaza (77.50% and 42.19%)
 Lac-à-la-Tortue (56.77% and 31.47%)*
 Lac-Édouard (92.89% and 43.08%)
 Lac-Saint-Charles (66.44% and 29.86%)*
 Lac-Tremblant-Nord (84.47% and 50.29%)
 L'Ancienne-Lorette (67.07% and 40.94%)
 LaSalle (60.81% and 20.55%)*
 Lennoxville (52.49% and 18.56%)*
 L'Île-Bizard (63.53% and 33.68%)*
 L'Île-Dorval (75.51% and 74.00%)
 Loretteville (33.62% and 14.35%)
 Magog (Township) (59.83% and 25.57%)*
 Maple Grove (48.65% and 31.43%)
 Masson-Angers (66.61% and 34.80%)*
 Melocheville (47.04% and 26.01%)
 Métis-sur-Mer (44.07% and 22.67%)
 Mont-Brun (28.92% and 20.35%)
 Montréal-Est (84.51% and 45.16%)
 Montreal West (82.62% and 47.52%)
 Mont-Royal (81.82% and 41.69%)
 Mont-Tremblant (71.10% and 31.34%)*
 Newport (72.03% and 35.78%)
 Notre-Dame-du-Mont-Carmel (38.44% and 26.97%)
 Parent (42.86% and 25.44%)
 Petit-Matane (24.52% and 10.96%)
 Pierrefonds (70.14% and 24.87%)*
 Pointe-Claire (90.02% and 52.81%)
 Robertsonville (43.62% and 32.82%)
 Roxboro (67.16% and 33.36%)*
 Saint-Aimé-du-Lac-des-Îles (79.59% and 52.38%)
 Saint-Athanase (44.75% and 22.02%)
 Saint-Augustin-de-Desmaures (62.48% and 38.40%)
 Saint-Bruno-de-Montarville (72.04% and 47.61%)
 Sainte-Agathe-Nord (51.19% and 19.03%)*
 Sainte-Anne-de-Bellevue (82.26% and 47.68%)
 Sainte-Foy (52.19% and 27.35%)*
 Sainte-Geneviève (65.65% and 21.49%)*
 Saint-Élie-d’Orford (47.81% and 23.33%)
 Saint-Émile (49.99% and 21.16%)
 Sainte-Rosalie (49.85% and 27.51%)
 Saint-Étienne-de-Lauzon (55.99% and 28.00%)*
 Sainte-Véronique (44.35% and 21.50%)
 Saint-Georges (50.87% and 26.47%)*
 Saint-Gérard-des-Laurentides (50.57% and 27.71%)*
 Saint-Jean-Baptiste (47.23% and 22.86%)
 Saint-Jean-des-Piles (31.32% and 18.32%)
 Saint-Lambert (69.71% and 41.40%)
 Saint-Laurent (75.31% and 28.58%)*
 Saint-Luc-de-Matane (29.24% and 16.62%)
 Saint-Nicolas (54.27% and 27.04%)*
 Saint-Rédempteur (37.62% and 19.68%)
 Saint-Timothée (59.47% and 30.02%)*
 Senneville (93.42% and 73.63%)
 Sillery (51.48% and 33.56%)*
 Township of Sutton (49.25% and 20.64%)
 Val-Bélair (49.76% and 18.68%)
 Vanier (61.37% and 23.19%)*
 Westmount (92.13% and 52.71%)

See also
Municipal history of Quebec
2000–2006 municipal reorganization in Quebec
2002–2006 municipal reorganization of Montreal
Merger (politics)
History of Montreal

External links
 2004 referendums (Elections Quebec) (how to interpret the numbers)

References

Local government in Quebec
Political history of Quebec
Municipal politics of Quebec
2004 referendums
2004 in Quebec
Quebec